Christy Oates (born 1980) is an American woodworker and furniture designer based in Fennimore, Wisconsin.

Early life and education 
Oates was born in Bloomington, Wisconsin, and later lived in La Crosse. She received her BFA in furniture design at the Minneapolis College of Art and Design, and completed her MFA, also in furniture design, at San Diego State University; her thesis exhibition was the subject of a piece in American Woodworker magazine.

Artwork 
Oates utilizes digital technologies such as computer-aided drafting (CAD) programs and computer numerical control (CNC) routers and laser cutters in her work. Oates says she is interested in the intersection of art and manufacturing.

Exhibitions 
Oates was among the artists featured in the exhibit "40 Under 40: Craft Futures" at the Renwick Gallery of the Smithsonian Museum of American Art, and two of her pieces were subsequently accessioned by the museum. Oates's work was included in the 2017 exhibition "Contemporary Wood Lighting" at the Messler Gallery of the Center for Furniture Craftsmanship. Her work was included in the exhibition "Making a Seat at the Table: Women Transform Woodworking" shown at the Center for Art in Wood in 2019–2020.

References

External links 
40 Under 40: Christy Oates
Christy Oates MFA Thesis Tour (YouTube)

1980 births
Living people
American woodworkers
American furniture designers
21st-century American women artists
21st-century American artists
Minneapolis College of Art and Design alumni
San Diego State University alumni
People from Grant County, Wisconsin
People from La Crosse, Wisconsin
Artists from Wisconsin
Women woodworkers